The Valea Negrileștilor is a right tributary of the Valea Mare in Romania. It flows into the Valea Mare in Negrilești.

References

Rivers of Romania
Rivers of Bistrița-Năsăud County
Rivers of Cluj County